The San Sebastian Cathedral is a late 19th-century church in Bacolod, Negros Occidental in the Philippines. It is the seat of the Roman Catholic Diocese of Bacolod.

History
A small village inhabited by Malayans called Magsungay was placed under the protection of St. Sebastian by early Christian missionaries during the 1700s. This village was later came to be known as San Sebastian de Magsungay and was put under the governance of Bernardo de los Santos, the village's first gobernadorcillo. Due to widespread Moro pirate attacks, the people of Magsungay moved to a new settlement upon the hilly terrain called bakólod, the precursor of the modern-day city of Bacolod. In 1806, Fr. Leon Pedro was appointed as its first parish priest. Years later, Fr. Gonzaga, a young priest from Barcelona, would envision the construction of the San Sebastian Church.

Original church
Fr. Julian (or Juan)  Gonzaga, from Barcelona, Spain, the parish priest from 1818 to 1836, constructed the original church in 1825. It was made of wood with galvanized iron roof. The church initially possessed a medium-sized bell. Donations of other church bells were made by Fr. Roman Manuel Locsin, who gave a large one, and Fr. Mariano de Avila, who gave another when he became the parish priest in 1863 after the death of Fr. Locsin.

Stone church

Construction of the structure in its present form began on 27 April 1876 under the leadership of Fr. Mauricio Ferrero, OAR. Prison labor was provided by the politico-military governor, Roman Pastor, who prevailed upon Fr. Ferrero to also design and supervise the construction of a stone prison, the old Provincial Jail. Coral stone from the island of Guimaras was used as the primary building material. Hardwood from trees in Palawan was used for wooden portions of the structure. Fr. Mariano de Avila's bell was installed in the bell tower during the church's construction. Bishop Mariano Cuartero of the Archdiocese of Jaro consecrated the church on the eve of the feast of Saint Sebastian, 19 January 1882. The following day Bishop Cuartero celebrated pontifical mass before a congregation of government and Church officials of the province and Iloilo, parish priests and leading citizens.

Bell towers

In 1885, construction of the two bell towers commenced. The right tower was constructed first. Don Luis Ruiz de Luzurriaga donated a large clock which was mounted on this structure. The left tower was then constructed. The towers were made of aluminum sheet framed in hardwood. That year, the church organ was installed in the narthex, above the church entrance. The church was declared a cathedral in 1933 when Bacolod became a diocese. During the centennial celebration of the Cathedral in 1976, the bells were transferred from the belfry to the churchyard.

Reconstructions

Bishop Manuel Yap consecrated the cathedral in solemn ceremonies presided over by the Apostolic Nuncio on 7 March 1956 after renovation. The main altar was simplified and a life-size statue of Saint Sebastian was enshrined. The cathedral again underwent renovation under the then-Vicar General and Bacolod parish priest, Antonio Fortich, who became the third Bishop of the Diocese of Bacolod in 1967.

In 1969, the Bacolod City Engineer's office declared the bell towers a public hazard; Fr. Mariano de Avila's bell was removed from the belfry and the structures were subsequently demolished. The church organ was also disassembled and never returned to its original place, as was Fr. de Avila's bell. The cathedral's rector, Fr. Antonio Santes, then raised funds to rebuild the towers in their present form. In 1976 the Lions Club of Bacolod had a special belfry built where today Fr. de Avila's bell hangs, along with Fr. Mauricio Ferrero's smaller bell.

Columbarium
The remains of Bishops Casimiro Lladoc and Manuel Yap, the first and second bishops of the Diocese of Bacolod, respectively, along with the remains of church benefactors are enshrined in the cathedral's columbarium.

Rectory
Fr. Mauricio Ferrero also constructed the parish rectory, which is now the bishop's house. Construction began on 21 May 1891 and was completed in 1894. The wood came from Palawan, while the coral stones were from Guimaras. The bricks were locally made, and labor was mostly by Chinese masons.

Patron saint

The San Sebastian Cathedral is named in honor of Saint Sebastian, an early Christian saint and martyr more commonly known in the Philippines as San Sebastian. The Spanish missionaries had placed Magsungay, the village that was the precursor of the modern city of Bacolod under the care and protection of Saint Sebastian sometime in the middle 1700s. Luis Fernando de Luna (1777-1779), a corregidor, donated a relic of the Saint for the growing mission, and the village came to be known as San Sebastian de Magsungay.

Pro-cathedral
On December 25, 1994, then-Bishop of the Diocese of Bacolod, Monsignor Camilo Gregorio declared the San Diego Parish Church a pro-cathedral of the San Sebastian Cathedral.

See also
Saint Sebastian
Cathedral
San Diego Pro-cathedral

References

External links

Catholic Encyclopedia: Saint Sebastian

Roman Catholic cathedrals in the Philippines
Roman Catholic churches in Negros Occidental
Buildings and structures in Bacolod
Baroque architecture in the Philippines
Spanish Colonial architecture in the Philippines
Tourist attractions in Bacolod